The 4th Secretariat of the Workers' Party of Korea (WPK)(4차 조선로동당 비서국), officially the Secretariat of the 4th Congress of the Workers' Party of Korea, was elected by the 14th Plenary Session of the 4th Central Committee on 12 October 1966.

Members

Add ons

References

Citations

Bibliography
Books:
 
 
  

Dissertations:
 

4th Secretariat of the Workers' Party of Korea
1966 establishments in North Korea
1970 disestablishments in North Korea